Ellerton Priory may refer to

Ellerton Priory (Swaledale), a ruined priory in North Yorkshire, England
Ellerton Priory (Spalding Moor), a former priory in the East Riding of Yorkshire, England
Ellerton Priory (parish), a civil parish in the East Riding of Yorkshire, England, abolished in 1935 to form part of Ellerton, East Riding of Yorkshire
Ellerton Priory Church, a redundant church at Ellerton, East Riding of Yorkshire, England

See also 
Ellerton Abbey